These are all the matches played by the Spain national football team between 1940 and 1959. Throughout this period they played in 63 matches, resulting in 28 victories, 19 draws and 16 defeats. Spain played in one FIFA World Cup, the 1950 edition, where they finished fourth.

Results 
63 matches played:

1940s

1950s

See also 
Spain national football team results
Spain national football team results (1920–1939)
Spain national football team results (1960–1979)

Notes

References

External links
Todos los partidos (all the games) at Selección Española de Fútbol (official site) 

1940s in Spain
1950s in Spain
1950
1940–41 in Spanish football
1941–42 in Spanish football
1942–43 in Spanish football
1943–44 in Spanish football
1944–45 in Spanish football
1945–46 in Spanish football
1946–47 in Spanish football
1947–48 in Spanish football
1948–49 in Spanish football
1949–50 in Spanish football
1950–51 in Spanish football
1951–52 in Spanish football
1952–53 in Spanish football
1953–54 in Spanish football
1954–55 in Spanish football
1955–56 in Spanish football
1956–57 in Spanish football
1957–58 in Spanish football
1958–59 in Spanish football
1959–60 in Spanish football